Hermitage Academy may refer to:

Hermitage Academy, Chester-le-Street, a secondary school in County Durham, England
Hermitage Academy, Helensburgh, a secondary school in Argyll and Bute, Scotland

See also
Hermitage (disambiguation)